Gentlemen's Game is the sixth Korean studio album (eleven overall) by South Korean boy band 2PM. The album was released on September 13, 2016, by JYP Entertainment as a celebration of their eight-year anniversary together. It was the final release by 2PM before the members began their military service.

Background and release
On September 4, 2016, the band member Lee Junho posted a schedule of 2PM's new album release dates, the teaser images of the members were released from September 5 to September 8, the music video teaser was released on September 9, and the track list and album spoiler were released on September 10. The final teaser was a choreography spoiler uploaded to JYP Entertainment's YouTube channel on September 11. The official music video for the title track "Promise (I'll Be)" was posted on September 13, along with the release of the full album.

Track listing

Release history

References

2016 albums
2PM albums
JYP Entertainment albums
Korean-language albums